The Classic of Poetry, also Shijing or Shih-ching, translated variously as the Book of Songs, Book of Odes, or simply known as the Odes or Poetry (Shī), is the oldest existing collection of Chinese poetry, comprising 305 works dating from the 11th to 7th centuries BCE. It is one of the "Five Classics" traditionally said to have been compiled by Confucius, and has been studied and memorized by scholars in China and neighboring countries over two millennia. It is also a rich source of chengyu (four-character classical idioms) that are still a part of learned discourse and even everyday language in modern Chinese. Since the Qing dynasty, its rhyme patterns have also been analysed in the study of Old Chinese phonology.

Name 
Early references refer to the anthology as the 300 Poems (shi). The Odes first became known as a jīng, or a "classic book", in the canonical sense, as part of the Han Dynasty's official adoption of Confucianism as the guiding principle of Chinese society. The same word shi later became a generic term for poetry. In English, lacking an exact equivalent for the Chinese, the translation of the word shi in this regard is generally as "poem", "song", or "ode". Before its elevation as a canonical classic, the Classic of Poetry (Shi jing) was known as the Three Hundred Songs or the Songs.

Content 
The Classic of Poetry contains the oldest chronologically authenticated Chinese poems. The majority of the Odes date to the Western Zhou period (1046–771 BCE), and were drawn from around provinces and cities in the Zhongyuan area. A final section of 5 "Eulogies of Shang" purports to be ritual songs of the Shang dynasty as handed down by their descendants in the state of Song, but is generally considered quite late in date. According to the Eastern Han scholar Zheng Xuan, the latest material in the Shijing was the song "Tree-Stump Grove" in the "Odes of Chen", dated to the middle of the Spring and Autumn period ( 600 BCE).

The content of the Poetry can be divided into two main sections: the "Airs of the States", and the "Eulogies" and "Hymns". 

The "Airs of the States" are shorter lyrics in simple language that are generally ancient folk songs which record the voice of the common people. They often speak of love and courtship, longing for an absent lover, soldiers on campaign, farming and housework, and political satire and protest. The first song of the "Airs of the States", "Fishhawk", is a well-known example of the category. Confucius commented on it, and it was traditionally given special interpretive weight.

On the other hand, songs in the two "Hymns" sections and the "Eulogies" section tend to be longer ritual or sacrificial songs, usually in the forms of courtly panegyrics and dynastic hymns which praise the founders of the Zhou dynasty. They also include hymns used in sacrificial rites and songs used by the aristocracy in their sacrificial ceremonies or at banquets.

"Court Hymns" contains "Lesser Court Hymns" and "Major Court Hymns". Most of the poems were used by the aristocrats to pray for good harvests each year, worship gods, and venerate their ancestors. The authors of "Major Court Hymns" are nobles who were dissatisfied with the political reality. Therefore, they wrote poems not only related to the feast, worship, and epic but also to reflect the public feelings.

Style 
Whether the various Shijing poems were folk songs or not, they "all seem to have passed through the hands of men of letters at the royal Zhou court". In other words, they show an overall literary polish together with some general stylistic consistency. About 95% of lines in the Poetry are written in a four-syllable meter, with a slight caesura between the second and third syllables. Lines tend to occur in syntactically related couplets, with occasional parallelism, and longer poems are generally divided into similarly structured stanzas.

All but six of the "Eulogies" consist of a single stanza, and the "Court Hymns" exhibit wide variation in the number of stanzas and their lengths. Almost all of the "Airs", however, consist of three stanzas, with four-line stanzas being most common. Although a few rhyming couplets occur, the standard pattern in such four-line stanzas required a rhyme between the second and fourth lines. Often the first or third lines would rhyme with these, or with each other. This style later became known as the "shi" style for much of Chinese history.

One of the characteristics of the poems in the Classic of Poetry is that they tend to possess "elements of repetition and variation". This results in an "alteration of similarities and differences in the formal structure: in successive stanzas, some lines and phrases are repeated verbatim, while others vary from stanza to stanza". Characteristically, the parallel or syntactically matched lines within a specific poem share the same, identical words (or characters) to a large degree, as opposed to confining the parallelism between lines to using grammatical category matching of the words in one line with the other word in the same position in the corresponding line; but, not by using the same, identical word(s). Disallowing verbal repetition within a poem would by the time of Tang poetry be one of the rules to distinguish the old style poetry from the new, regulated style.

The works in the Classic of Poetry vary in their lyrical qualities, which relates to the musical accompaniment with which they were in their early days performed. The songs from the "Hymns" and "Eulogies", which are the oldest material in the Poetry, were performed to slow, heavy accompaniment from bells, drums, and stone chimes. However, these and the later actual musical scores or choreography which accompanied the Shijing poems have been lost.

Nearly all of the songs in the Poetry are rhyming, with end rhyme, as well as frequent internal rhyming. While some of these verses still rhyme in modern varieties of Chinese, others had ceased to rhyme by the Middle Chinese period. For example, the eighth song ( Fú Yǐ) has a tightly constrained structure implying rhymes between the penultimate words (here shown in bold) of each pair of lines:

The second and third stanzas still rhyme in modern Standard Chinese, with the rhyme words even having the same tone, but the first stanza does not rhyme in Middle Chinese or any modern variety. Such cases were attributed to lax rhyming practice until the late-Ming dynasty scholar Chen Di argued that the original rhymes had been obscured by sound change.
Since Chen, scholars have analyzed the rhyming patterns of the Poetry as crucial evidence for the reconstruction of Old Chinese phonology.

Traditional scholarship of the Poetry identified three major literary devices employed in the songs: straightforward narrative (fù ), explicit comparisons (bǐ ) and implied comparisons (xìng ). The poems of the Classic of Poetry tend to have certain typical patterns in both rhyme and rhythm, to make much use of imagery, often derived from nature.

Authorship 
Although the Shijing does not specify the names of authors in association with the contained works, both traditional commentaries and modern scholarship have put forth hypotheses on authorship. The "Golden Coffer" chapter of the Book of Documents says that the poem "Owl" in the "Odes of Bin" was written by the Duke of Zhou. Many of the songs appear to be folk songs and other compositions used in the court ceremonies of the aristocracy. Furthermore, many of the songs, based on internal evidence, appear to be written either by women, or from the perspective of a female persona. The repeated emphasis on female authorship of poetry in the Shijing was made much of in the process of attempting to give the poems of the women poets of the Ming-Qing period canonical status. Despite the impersonality of the poetic voice characteristic of the Songs, many of the poems are written from the perspective of various generic personalities.

Textual history 

According to tradition, the method of collection of the various Shijing poems involved the appointment of officials, whose duties included documenting verses current from the various states which constituted the empire. Out of these many collected pieces, also according to tradition, Confucius made a final editorial round of decisions for elimination or inclusion in the received version of the Poetry. As with all great literary works of ancient China, the Poetry has been annotated and commented on numerous times throughout history, as well as in this case providing a model to inspire future poetic works.

Various traditions concern the gathering of the compiled songs and the editorial selection from these make up the classic text of the Odes: "Royal Officials' Collecting Songs" is recorded in the Book of Han, and "Master Confucius Deletes Songs" refers to Confucius and his mention in the Records of the Grand Historian, where it says from originally some 3,000 songs and poems in a previously extant "Odes" that Confucius personally selected the "300" which he felt best conformed to traditional ritual propriety, thus producing the Classic of Poetry.

In 2015 the Anhui University purchased a group of looted manuscripts, among which the oldest extant version of the Classic of Poetry (at least part of it). The manuscript has been published in the first volume of this collection of manuscripts, .

Compilation 
The Confucian school eventually came to consider the verses of the "Airs of the States" to have been collected in the course of activities of officers dispatched by the Zhou Dynasty court, whose duties included the field collection of the songs local to the territorial states of Zhou. This territory was roughly the Yellow River Plain, Shandong, southwestern Hebei, eastern Gansu, and the Han River region. Perhaps during the harvest. After the officials returned from their missions, the king was said to have observed them himself in an effort to understand the current condition of the common people. The well-being of the people was of special concern to the Zhou because of their ideological position that the right to rule was based on the benignity of the rulers to the people in accordance with the will of Heaven, and that this Heavenly Mandate would be withdrawn upon the failure of the ruling dynasty to ensure the prosperity of their subjects. The people's folksongs were deemed to be the best gauge of their feelings and conditions, and thus indicative of whether the nobility was ruling according to the mandate of Heaven or not, accordingly the songs were collected from the various regions, converted from their diverse regional dialects into standard literary language, and presented accompanied with music at the royal courts.

Confucius 
The Classic of Poetry historically has a major place in the Four Books and Five Classics, the canonical works associated with Confucianism. Some pre-Qin dynasty texts, such as the Analects and a recently excavated manuscript from 300 BCE entitled "Confucius' Discussion of the Odes", mention Confucius' involvement with the Classic of Poetry but Han dynasty historian Sima Qian's Records of the Grand Historian was the first work to directly attribute the work to Confucius. Subsequent Confucian tradition held that the Shijing collection was edited by Confucius from a larger 3,000-piece collection to its traditional 305-piece form. This claim is believed to reflect an early Chinese tendency to relate all of the Five Classics in some way or another to Confucius, who by the 1st century BCE had become the model of sages and was believed to have maintained a cultural connection to the early Zhou dynasty. This view is now generally discredited, as the Zuo zhuan records that the Classic of Poetry already existed in a definitive form when Confucius was just a young child.

In works attributed to him, Confucius comments upon the Classic of Poetry in such a way as to indicate that he holds it in great esteem. A story in the Analects recounts that Confucius' son Kong Li told the story: "The Master once stood by himself, and I hurried to seek teaching from him. He asked me, 'You've studied the Odes?' I answered, 'Not yet.' He replied, 'If you have not studied the Odes, then I have nothing to say.'"

Han dynasty 
According to Han tradition, the Poetry and other classics were targets of the burning of books in 213 BCE under Qin Shi Huang, and the songs had to be reconstructed largely from memory in the subsequent Han period. However the discovery of pre-Qin copies showing the same variation as Han texts, as well as evidence of Qin patronage of the Poetry, have led modern scholars to doubt this account.

During the Han period there were three different versions of the Poetry which each belonged to different hermeneutic traditions. The Lu Poetry ( Lǔ shī), the Qi Poetry ( Qí shī) and the Han Poetry ( Hán shī) were officially recognized with chairs at the Imperial Academy during the reign of Emperor Wu of Han (156–87 BCE). Until the later years of the Eastern Han period, the dominant version of the Poetry was the Lu Poetry, named after the state of Lu, and founded by Shen Pei, a student of a disciple of the Warring States period philosopher Xunzi.

The Mao Tradition of the Poetry ( Máo shī zhuàn), attributed to an obscure scholar named Máo Hēng who lived during the 2nd or 3rd centuries BCE, was not officially recognized until the reign of Emperor Ping (1 BCE to 6 CE). However, during the Eastern Han period, the Mao Poetry gradually became the primary version. Proponents of the Mao Poetry said that its text was descended from the first generation of Confucius' students, and as such should be the authoritative version. Xu Shen's influential dictionary Shuowen Jiezi, written in the 2nd-century CE, quotes almost exclusively from the Mao Poetry. Finally, the renowned Eastern Han scholar Zheng Xuan used the Mao Poetry as the basis for his annotated 2nd-century edition of the Poetry. Zheng Xuan's edition of the Mao text was itself the basis of the "Right Meaning of the Mao Poetry" which became the imperially authorized text and commentary on the Poetry in 653 CE.

By the 5th-century, the Lu, Qi, and Han traditions had died out, leaving only the Mao Poetry, which has become the received text in use today.
Only isolated fragments of the Lu text survive, among the remains of the Xiping Stone Classics.

Legacy

Confucian allegory 

The Book of Odes has been a revered Confucian classic since the Han Dynasty, and has been studied and memorized by centuries of scholars in China. The individual songs of the Odes, though frequently on simple, rustic subjects, have traditionally been saddled with extensive, elaborate allegorical meanings that assigned moral or political meaning to the smallest details of each line. The popular songs were seen as good keys to understanding the troubles of the common people, and were often read as allegories; complaints against lovers were seen as complaints against faithless rulers, "if a maiden warns her lover not to be too rash... commentators promptly discover that the piece refers to a feudal noble whose brother had been plotting against him...".

The extensive allegorical traditions associated with the Odes were theorized by Herbert Giles to have begun in the Warring States period as a justification for Confucius' focus upon such a seemingly simple and ordinary collection of verses. These elaborate, far-fetched interpretations seem to have gone completely unquestioned until the 12th century, when scholar Zheng Qiao (1104–1162) first wrote his scepticism of them. European sinologists like Giles and Marcel Granet ignored these traditional interpretations in their analysis of the original meanings of the Odes. Granet, in his list of rules for properly reading the Odes, wrote that readers should "take no account of the standard interpretation", "reject in no uncertain terms the distinction drawn between songs evicting a good state of morals and songs attesting to perverted morality", and "[discard] all symbolic interpretations, and likewise any interpretation that supposes a refined technique on the part of the poets". These traditional allegories of politics and morality are no longer seriously followed by any modern readers in China or elsewhere.

Political influence 
The Odes became an important and controversial force, influencing political, social and educational phenomena. During the struggle between Confucian, Legalist, and other schools of thought, the Confucians used the Shijing to bolster their viewpoint. On the Confucian side, the Shijing became a foundational text which informed and validated literature, education, and political affairs. The Legalists, on their side, attempted to suppress the Shijing by violence, after the Legalist philosophy was endorsed by the Qin Dynasty, prior to their final triumph over the neighboring states: the suppression of Confucian and other thought and literature after the Qin victories and the start of Burning of Books and Burying of Scholars era, starting in 213 BCE, extended to attempt to prohibit the Shijing.

As the idea of allegorical expression grew, when kingdoms or feudal leaders wished to express or validate their own positions, they would sometimes couch the message within a poem, or by allusion. This practice became common among educated Chinese in their personal correspondences and spread to Japan and Korea as well.

Modern scholarship 
Modern scholarship on the Classic of Poetry often focuses on doing linguistic reconstruction and research in Old Chinese by analyzing the rhyme schemes in the Odes, which show vast differences when read in modern Mandarin Chinese. Although preserving more Old Chinese syllable endings than Mandarin, Modern Cantonese and Min Nan are also quite different from the Old Chinese language represented in the Odes.

C.H. Wang refers to the account of King Wu's victory over the Shang dynasty in the "Major Court Hymns" as the "Weniad" (a name that parallels The Iliad), seeing it as part of a greater narrative discourse in China that extols the virtues of wén ( "literature, culture") over more military interests.

Contents list 
Summary of groupings of poems from the Classic of Poetry

Note: alternative divisions may be topical or chronological (Legge): Song, Daya, Xiaoya, Guofeng

Notable translations 
  Part 1, Part 2. rpt. Hong Kong: Hong Kong University Press (1960).
 
 
  Latin translation.
 ; rpt. New York: Paragon (1969).
  
  Translated into English by E. D. Edwards (1932), Festivals and Songs of Ancient China, New York: E.P. Dutton.
  Rpt. New York: Grove Press, 1996, with a Preface by Joseph Allen. .
  Reprint of
 
 
 
 
  Cheng Junying 程俊英 (1985). Shijing Yizhu 诗经译注 [Shijing, Translated and Annotated]. Shanghai: Shanghai Guji Chubanshe and 
  Cheng Junying 程俊英 (1991). Shijing Zhuxi 詩經注析 [Shijing, Annotation and Analysis]. Zhonghua Publishing House.
  Mekada, Makoto 目加田誠 (1991). Shikyō 詩経. Tokyo: Kōbansha.

See also 

 Chinese classics
 Classical Chinese poetry
 Geese in Chinese poetry
 "Guan ju"
 Chengyu
 Chinese art

Notes

References

Citations

Works cited

External links 

 Bilingual Chinese-English searchable edition at Chinese Text Project 
 Shi Ji Zhuan from the Chinese Text Initiative, University of Virginia: Chinese text based on Zhu Xi's edition; English translation from James Legge, with Chinese names updated to pinyin.
 The Book of Odes at Wengu zhixin. Chinese text with James Legge and Marcel Granet (partial) translations.
 Legge translation of the Book of Odes at the Internet Sacred Text Archive.
 Shijing and collated commentaries (Harrison Huang's website) (Chinese text)
 The Book of Songs at Chinese Notes; Chinese and English parallel text with matching dictionary entries.

 
Chinese classic texts
Confucian texts
Chinese poetry collections
Chinese folk songs
Chinese poetry anthologies
Old Chinese
Zhou dynasty texts
11th-century BC literature
1st-millennium BC books
Four Books and Five Classics
Thirteen Classics